Mustafa Yürür (born 26 June 1938) is a Turkish footballer. He played in 18 matches for the Turkey national football team from 1960 to 1968.

References

1938 births
Living people
Turkish footballers
Turkey international footballers
Place of birth missing (living people)
Association footballers not categorized by position